O da Beni Seviyor or Summer Love is a 2001 Turkish drama film  directed and written by Barış Pirhasan with Gül Dirican.

Cast
Ece Ekşi as Esma Hanım
Lale Mansur as Saliha
Luk Piyes as Hüseyin
Ayla Algan
Ayşe Nil Şamlıoğlu
Burak Sergen
Bezmi Baskın
Hale Akınlı
Kemal İnci
Serra Yılmaz
Şerif Sezer
Taner Birsel
Tomris İncer
Tuncel Kurtiz
Uğur Polat

External links 

2001 films
2000s Turkish-language films
2001 drama films
Films set in Turkey
Turkish drama films